This is a list of all Pacific typhoons that have had their names retired from the international list of tropical cyclone names used in the Western Pacific Ocean. Since tropical cyclones started to be named in the basin after World War Two a total of 65 typhoon names have been retired. Those typhoons that have their names retired tend to be exceptionally destructive storms. Several names were removed or altered naming list for various reasons other than retirement. Collectively, the typhoons with retired names have caused over $108 billion in damage ( USD), as well as over 12,000 deaths.

Background

The practice of using names to identify tropical cyclones goes back several centuries, with systems named after places, saints or things they hit before the formal start of naming in the Western Pacific. These included the Kamikaze, 1906 Hong Kong typhoon, 1922 Shantou typhoon and the 1934 Muroto typhoon.

The practice of retiring significant names was started during 1955 by the United States Weather Bureau in the Northern Atlantic basin, after hurricanes Carol, Edna, and Hazel struck the East Coast of the United States and caused a significant amount of damage in the previous year. Initially the names were only designed to be retired for ten years after which they might be reintroduced; however, it was decided at the 1969 Interdepartmental hurricane conference, that any significant hurricane in the future would have its name permanently retired. The first tropical cyclone names to be retired in the Western Pacific were Lucille and Ophelia during 1960. Several names have been removed from the Pacific naming lists for various other reasons than causing a significant amount of death/destruction, which include being pronounced in a very similar way to other names and  political reasons.

In 2000, the Japan Meteorological Agency (JMA) began naming tropical cyclones from a list of 140 names, submitted by 14 countries. Previously, the JMA labeled storms with numbers, but not names. The JMA has been the official warning agency of the western Pacific Ocean since 1981, though other organizations have also tracked typhoons. The Joint Typhoon Warning Center (JTWC) unofficially named tropical cyclones from 1947 to 1999. During this time period, there were several pre-determined tropical cyclone lists, in which many names were removed and replaced with others. The Philippine Atmospheric, Geophysical and Astronomical Services Administration (PAGASA) names tropical cyclones using a separate list, which is adjusted periodically.

Between 1947 and 2000, eleven names of significant tropical cyclones were retired from the list of names used by the United States Joint Typhoon Warning Center. During this time other names were removed from the naming lists, including in 1979 when the lists of names used were revised to include both male and female names. Tropical Storm Lucille was the first name to be retired for its impacts, while Ophelia was retired because of its long  track.

At the 33rd session of the typhoon committee held in November 2000, the committee was informed that the India Meteorological Department had objected to the name Hanuman being used as a name because of potential religious sentiments. Thailand also requested that the spelling of several names be corrected and indicated a desire to change the names Prapiroon, Durian and Khanun. The representatives of the United States of America also requested that the name Kodo be changed as it would have an undesirable meaning if mispronounced.  The session subsequently accepted the spelling changes as well as the requests from Thailand and the United States and established that both countries would submit a list of four names in priority order to its Secretariat within a week of the session ending. The Typhoon Committee Secretariat would then circulate the list to all members for comment, with the highest priority name acceptable to all members used. The secretariat subsequently reported to the following years session that the names Morakot and Aere had replaced Hanuman and Kodo.

Names

See also

List of retired Atlantic hurricane names
List of retired Pacific hurricane names
List of retired Philippine typhoon names
List of retired Australian cyclone names
List of retired South Pacific tropical cyclone names

Notes

References

External links

 
Names Pacific typhoon retired